"Catching Feelings" is a song by New Zealand band Drax Project, featuring Six60. The song was written as a collaboration between the bands in 2017, and was released as a single from Drax Project's debut album Drax Project in September 2019. A new version featuring Brooklyn group Phony Ppl was released in July 2021.

Background and composition

The song was a produce of the writing sessions Drax Project and Six60 had in 2017 at Marlon Gerbes' home, after meeting at a New Zealand music festival. Six60 members Marlon Gerbes and Matiu Walters gave the band advice, that a song should work well in a stripped-down version, which they applied to "Catching Feelings", as well as their songs "Woke Up Late" (2017) and "Smart Love" (2019).

The piano outro was performed by a high school friend of Shaan Singh's, Leonardo, and the vocal chorus bridge featuring the members of Six60 was recorded in March 2017.

Release

The song was released on 4 September 2019, three weeks before their debut album. In July 2021, a new version of the song was released featuring Brooklyn group Phony Ppl, which was released to radio in the United States.

Critical reception

The song was nominated for the Single of the Year award at the 2020 Aotearoa Music Awards.

Credits and personnel

Credits adapted from Tidal.

Devin Abrams – songwriting
Matt Beachen – songwriting
Drax Project – performer
Marlon Gerbes – songwriting
Ben O'Leary – songwriting
Shaan Singh – songwriting, vocals
Six60 – performer
Sam Thomson – songwriting
Matiu Walters – songwriting

Charts

Weekly charts

Year-end charts

Certifications

References

2019 singles
2019 songs
Drax Project songs
Six60 songs
New Zealand songs